"Ghost of Days Gone By" is a song written and performed by the band Alter Bridge, released in the United States as the third single from their third album, AB III, on April 18, 2011. In the United States, the song was self-released via EMI, like the album. Musically, the song features a somewhat lighter tone than other songs on the album except for the much heavier and darker bridge. The song's lyrics are about mortality, reminiscing past memories, and "coming to terms with the fact that time will go on."

Background
The band hinted via Facebook that "Ghost of Days Gone By" would be released as the second single in North America and the third single overall, after "Isolation" and "I Know It Hurts," the latter of which was released worldwide except for the United States. On March 7, 2011 the band wrote on Facebook "The Ghost Of Days Gone By... haunting North America this spring... It's coming!!!" It was later shown on FMQB that the song would be self-released via EMI to rock radio on April 18, 2011. The official artwork for the single was designed by guitarist Mark Tremonti's brother Dan Tremonti, who has designed all of the artwork for the band. It was revealed via Facebook on March 17, 2011. It was released to rock radio on March 28, 2011.

Song meaning
Lead vocalist Myles Kennedy said that the song is "a bit of a departure from the theme of the rest of the record." He explained:

In other media
 In You Think You Know Me: The Story of Edge, the song appears at the end of the documentary where it was played during a montage commemorating the career of WWE Hall of Famer Edge, who is best known for using the band's song "Metalingus" as his theme song.

Credits and personnel
Alter Bridge
 Myles Kennedy – lead vocals, rhythm guitar
 Mark Tremonti – lead guitar, backing vocals
 Brian Marshall – bass
 Scott Phillips – drums

Charts

Weekly charts

Year-end charts

References

2011 singles
Alter Bridge songs
Songs written by Mark Tremonti
Songs written by Myles Kennedy
2010 songs
Songs written by Brian Marshall
Songs written by Scott Phillips (musician)
Capitol Records singles
Song recordings produced by Michael Baskette